Víctor Manuel Bonilla Hinestroza  (born 23 January 1971) is a Colombian former professional footballer who played as a striker.

His extensive career includes defending the colors for Deportivo Cali, América de Cali, Deportes Tolima, Atlético Huila, Cortuluá and Deportes Quindio in Colombia, Real Sociedad and UD Salamanca in the Spanish La Liga, Toulouse FC, FC Nantes and Montpellier HSC in Ligue 1, Dorados de Sinaloa in the Mexican league and  Barcelona Sporting Club in the Ecuador Serie A.

External links 

Spanish La Liga statistics
Victor Bonilla, El Incansable
Victor Bonilla Hopes to retire in Dec 2010 to become a Soccer Coach

1971 births
Living people
People from Tumaco
Colombian footballers
Association football forwards
Colombia international footballers
1997 Copa América players
1999 Copa América players
2000 CONCACAF Gold Cup players
Categoría Primera A players
La Liga players
Ligue 1 players
Deportivo Cali footballers
Real Sociedad footballers
UD Salamanca players
Toulouse FC players
FC Nantes players
Montpellier HSC players
Al-Rayyan SC players
Cortuluá footballers
Dorados de Sinaloa footballers
América de Cali footballers
Deportes Tolima footballers
Barcelona S.C. footballers
Atlético Huila footballers
Atlético F.C. footballers
Deportes Quindío footballers
Ecuadorian Serie A players
Colombian expatriate footballers
Colombian expatriate sportspeople in Spain
Expatriate footballers in Spain
Colombian expatriate sportspeople in France
Expatriate footballers in France
Colombian expatriate sportspeople in Mexico
Expatriate footballers in Mexico
Colombian expatriate sportspeople in Ecuador
Expatriate footballers in Ecuador
Qatar Stars League players
Sportspeople from Nariño Department